Rumen Ivanov (Bulgarian: Румен Иванов) (born 14 September 1973) is a Bulgarian football forward.

Club Playing Honours
Botev Plovdiv
 Bulgarian Cup: runner-up 1995

Individual Honours
Young Boys
 Swiss Challenge League Top Scorer: 1998 (with 24 goals)

References

External links 
 Profile at LevskiSofia.info
 2011-12 Season

1973 births
Living people
Bulgarian footballers
FC Etar Veliko Tarnovo players
Botev Plovdiv players
PFC Levski Sofia players
BSC Young Boys players
FC Aarau players
SV Waldhof Mannheim players
PFC Rodopa Smolyan players
FC Etar 1924 Veliko Tarnovo players
FC Lokomotiv Gorna Oryahovitsa players
First Professional Football League (Bulgaria) players
Expatriate footballers in Switzerland
Expatriate footballers in Germany
Expatriate footballers in Cyprus
Association football forwards